E Bappa is a 2011 Maldivian family drama directed by Yoosuf Shafeeu. Produced by Koyya Hassan Manik under Lantern Production, the film stars Yoosuf Shafeeu, Sheela Najeeb, Amira Ismail, Fathimath Fareela, Koyya Hassan Manik and Mohamed Manik in pivotal roles. The film was released on 31 May 2011. Upon release, the film received mixed to negative reviews from critics and was considered a box office failure.

Premise
Hassan (Koyya Hassan Manik) successfully lands a job as a sailor and considering his financial insecurities, leaves his three children and wife, Atheefa (Mariyam Shakeela) to return after few years when he is financially stable.
After his departure, Atheefa prostituted herself and abandons her children. Realizing his grave mistake, Hassan divorces Atheefa and is forced to separate the children where he looked after his only daughter, Sheeza (Amira Ismail) and his friend, Adamfulhu took care of his two sons, Liyaz (Yoosuf Shafeeu) and Iyaz (Lufshan Shakeeb).
Years later, Atheefa returns to the family and starts brainwashing her children and in-laws while bad-mouthing about their father.
Atheefa and Liyaz's wife (Sheela Najeeb) conspire to throw Hassan out of the house when an accident resulted in him being handicapped.

Cast
 Yoosuf Shafeeu as Liyaz
 Sheela Najeeb as Sabeeaa
 Amira Ismail as Sheeza
 Fathimath Fareela as Mazeena
 Koyya Hassan Manik as Hassan
 Mohamed Manik as Yooshau
 Mariyam Shakeela as Atheefa
 Lufshan Shakeeb as Iyaz 
 Roanu Hassan Manik as Mazeena's father
 Maajidha as Nadheema
 Ali Shameel as Sheeza's step-father (Special appearance)
 Mariyam Haleem as Mariyam (Special appearance)
 Reeko Moosa Manik as Moosa (Special appearance)
 Mohamed Rasheed as Adhurey (Special appearance)
 Abdulla Naseer as Alibe (Special appearance)

Soundtrack

References

Maldivian drama films
2011 films
Films directed by Yoosuf Shafeeu
2011 drama films
Dhivehi-language films